Ceraticelus laetabilis is a species of dwarf spider in the family Linyphiidae. It is found in the United States and Canada.

Subspecies
These two subspecies belong to the species Ceraticelus laetabilis:
 (Ceraticelus laetabilis laetabilis) (O. P.-Cambridge, 1874)
 Ceraticelus laetabilis pisga Chamberlin, 1949

References

Linyphiidae
Articles created by Qbugbot
Spiders described in 1874